Polyptychoides assimilis is a moth of the  family Sphingidae. It is found in South and East Africa, including Sudan. Some authors consider it to be a subspecies of  Polyptychoides grayii.

External links
 Retrieved April 23, 2018.

Polyptychoides
Moths described in 1903